The Howard County Courthouse, on Indian St. between 6th and 7th Sts. in St. Paul, Nebraska, was built in 1912.  It was designed by Berlinghof & Davis and George A. Berlinghof in Classical Revival style.

It is a four-story building made of brick and of Bedford, Indiana limestone.

It was listed on the National Register of Historic Places in 1990.  The listing included one contributing building and one contributing object.

It was deemed significant architecturally and for its association with local politics and government of Howard County, Nebraska.  It was asserted to be "an important example" of Nebraska
architect George A. Berlinghof's work, in this case as part of Berlinghof & Davis;  it included features later used by Berlinghof in the Greeley County Courthouse and the Franklin County Courthouse and therefore demonstrated "the evolution of his designs."

References

External links 
More photos of the Howard County Courthouse at Wikimedia Commons

Courthouses on the National Register of Historic Places in Nebraska
Neoclassical architecture in Nebraska
Government buildings completed in 1912
Buildings and structures in Howard County, Nebraska
County courthouses in Nebraska
1912 establishments in Nebraska
Historic districts on the National Register of Historic Places in Nebraska
National Register of Historic Places in Howard County, Nebraska